Purvi or poorvi is Pūrvi of the ten basic thaats of Hindustani music from the Indian subcontinent. It is also the name of a raga within this thaat.

Description
Poorvi thaat adds a Komal Dhaivat to Marva thaat. These thaat ragas usually feature komal Rishabh, shuddha Gandhar and Shuddha Nishad along with teevra Madhyam, the note which distinguishes evening from the morning ragas (dawn and sunset). The thaat raga Poorvi is deeply serious, quiet and mysterious in character and is performed at the time of sunset. Pictorial depictions in early texts, often mention the poise, grace, and charm of Poorvi.

Ragas
Ragas in Poorvi thaat include:

 Poorvi
 Puriya Dhanashree
 Gauri
 Shree
 Paraj
 Basant
 Lalit

References

Hindustani music theory